Arthur Ashin (born 20 April 1982), better known by his stage name Autre Ne Veut, is an American singer-songwriter and musician from New York City.

The name Autre Ne Veut is taken from an inscription in French on a 15th-century British dress ornament that is stored at The Cloisters and is translated to English as "I want no other."

Biography
Ashin was born on 20 April 1982 in Raleigh, North Carolina. He earned his undergraduate degree at Hampshire College, where he lived with Daniel Lopatin (later of Oneohtrix Point Never). After college, Ashin lived briefly in New York City and Chicago before establishing his home in Brooklyn. He briefly enrolled in a Master’s program in Clinical Psychology but dropped out in order to focus on his music.

Ashin's debut album and the subsequent "Body EP" were recorded at home. Additionally, although it was never heard by the public before a one-time performance in 2016, Ashin recorded a “lost” album. Written during the winter of 2011-12 between “Body EP” and “Anxiety”, Ashin titled the album “kingofpop” in a characteristic self-deprecating reference to Michael Jackson.

Ashin's 2013 album, Anxiety, was self-produced as well; however, Ford & Lopatin contributed to the recording in a studio. Anxiety received a 7.6 out of 10 on the meta-review site anydecentmusic.com. including Best New Music from Pitchfork. Gorilla vs. Bear named Anxiety as "Album of Year (so far)" in June 2013.

In July 2013, Ashin released a single titled "On & On" as part of the Adult Swim Summer Singles series.

Discography

Albums
Autre Ne Veut (2010)
kingofpop (2012)
Anxiety (2013)
Age of Transparency (2015)

Singles & EPs
Body EP (2011)
Don's Rainbow (2011)
Okay (2022)

References

External links
 Official website

Living people
American electronic musicians
1982 births
Hampshire College alumni
21st-century American singers